France Bleu Gascogne is a regional radio station, owned by France Bleu, broadcasting, in general terms, across the historical region of Gascogne, as well as some of the Northern Basque Country alongside the regional equivalent. It covers regional news, culture, sports, etc., and it also features some of its own flagship emissions. Their programming schedule is available on their website. The radio also has its own official Twitter feed, where it discusses interviews and local news.

History 
The station was established as an evolution of Radio Landes in 1983. It was limited to covering the department of Landes and some surrounding areas on FM, which was still just emerging as 1st over AM at the time.

References 

Radio stations in France

Radio France